Nevrina procopia is a moth in the family Crambidae. It was described by Stoll in 1781. The type locality is unknown. It is found from Sri Lanka, India and Bhutan.

References

Moths described in 1781
Pyraustinae